General Donald Joseph Kutyna (born December 6, 1933) is a retired United States Air Force officer. He was commander in chief of the North American Aerospace Defense Command and the United States Space Command from 1990 to 1992, and commander of Air Force Space Command at Peterson Air Force Base, Colorado from 1987 to 1990.

Early years in the Air Force
Kutyna attended the University of Iowa for two years and was appointed to the United States Military Academy, graduating with a Bachelor of Science degree in the Class of 1957.

Upon completing pilot training at Vance Air Force Base, Oklahoma, in September 1958, Kutyna was assigned to the 33rd Bombardment Squadron at March Air Force Base, California, serving as a B-47 combat crew commander until June 1963.

In June 1965, Kutyna graduated from the Massachusetts Institute of Technology with a Master of Science degree in aeronautics and astronautics. Afterwards he was assigned to the Aerospace Research Pilot School, Edwards Air Force Base, California, first as a student and then as a staff director, training test pilots, and astronauts for United States aviation and space programs.

From December 1969 to January 1971, Kutyna served a combat tour of duty with the 44th Tactical Fighter Squadron at Takhli Royal Thai Air Force Base, Thailand, completing 120 combat missions in the F-105 tactical fighter. Of Polish origin, Kutyna named an F-105D that he flew in combat “The Polish Glider”. That aircraft is now in the Polish Aviation Museum in Kraków, Poland; various model kits of it have been manufactured.

Upon his return from Southeast Asia, Kutyna was assigned to Headquarters United States Air Force, Washington, D.C., as a development planner in the Office of the Deputy Chief of Staff for Research and Development. In June 1973, after a tour of duty with the Air Force Scientific Advisory Board, he was assigned as executive officer to the undersecretary of the Air Force.

In August 1975 Kutyna entered the Industrial College of the Armed Forces. After graduation in July 1976, he transferred to Electronic Systems Division, Hanscom Air Force Base, Massachusetts, with duty as assistant deputy for international programs. He then served as program manager for foreign military sales of the E-3A Airborne Warning and Control System aircraft, and later became assistant program director for the overall E-3A program.

In June 1980 Kutyna was appointed deputy for surveillance and control systems, responsible for the development and acquisition of the sensors and command centers used today by NORAD, and by the United States Space Command, in the satisfaction of their world-wide missions.

Los Angeles Air Force Base and Space Shuttle program
In June 1982, Kutyna became deputy commander for space launch and control systems at Space Division, Air Force Systems Command, Los Angeles Air Force Station, California. In this position he managed the Department of Defense Space Shuttle program, including the design and construction of the West Coast space shuttle launch site at Vandenberg Air Force Base, California; the acquisition of space shuttle upper stage boosters; and the operational aspects of launching military payloads on the shuttle.

Other responsibilities encompassed the development, acquisition and launch support of all Air Force expendable launch vehicles, including the Titan and Atlas space boosters and the Titan IV heavy lift launch vehicle, which provides a capability equivalent to the space shuttle. His programs for control of space missions encompassed the operations and upgrade of the Air Force satellite control network, and development of Air Force Space Command's Consolidated Space Operations Center, Falcon Air Force Station, Colorado. In June 1984 Kutyna became director of space systems and command, control and communications, Office of the Deputy Chief of Staff, Research, Development and Acquisition, at Air Force headquarters.

Kutyna is perhaps most famous for his aid in several investigations of NASA launch failures, especially his membership on the Rogers Commission investigating the loss of the Space Shuttle Challenger. He was particularly critical of NASA's decision to allow the shuttle to keep flying despite knowledge of the catastrophic O-ring flaw that ultimately led to the disaster.  He likened this situation to an airline allowing a plane to fly despite evidence that one of its wings was about to fall off.  While serving, he befriended fellow panelist Richard Feynman, who later described their partnership in his humorous memoir What Do You Care What Other People Think?. The partnership of Kutyna and Feynman was critical in the discovery and publication of the cause of the Challenger disaster: Kutyna told Feynman about how he was repairing his car and discovered that some seals failed due to low temperatures that morning. That inspired Feynman, who discovered the truth about O-ring weakness: they lack elasticity when at or below a temperature of  degrees, such as the morning of the accident. Feynman knew an astronaut had given Kutyna the crucial piece of information that led to his O-Ring insight; Kutyna later revealed that it was Sally Ride, a fellow member of the investigation commission but still a NASA employee at the time: 

The events of the Challenger investigation were dramatized in a 2013 TV film The Challenger Disaster, where Kutyna was portrayed by Bruce Greenwood.

Kutyna returned to Los Angeles Air Force Station as vice commander of Space Division in June 1986, overseeing all space system acquisitions, with particular emphasis on programs associated with the Strategic Defense Initiative.

Air Force Space Command
In November 1987 Kutyna became commander of the Air Force Space Command, the newest major command in the Air Force, with headquarters at Peterson Air Force Base. General Kutyna's forces conducted missile warning, space surveillance and satellite control operations at 46 locations around the world. He assumed command of the North American Aerospace Defense Command and the United States Space Command in April, 1990.

Kutyna was a command pilot with more than 4,500 flying hours in 25 different fighters and bombers. His military awards and decorations include the Defense Distinguished Service Medal with oak leaf cluster, Air Force Distinguished Service Medal, Legion of Merit with oak leaf cluster, Distinguished Flying Cross with oak leaf cluster, Air Medal with eight oak leaf clusters, and Air Force Commendation Medal with two oak leaf clusters.

Kutyna received the National Geographic Society's General Thomas D. White U.S. Air Force Space Trophy in June 1987, an award given to the individual who has made the most outstanding contribution to the nation's progress in space.

Kutyna was promoted to General on April 1, 1990, with same date of rank, and retired June 30, 1992.

References

External links

Official Biography
Interview
Donald J.Kutyna REACHING FOR THE STARS

1933 births
Living people
American people of Polish descent
United States Air Force generals
Recipients of the Distinguished Flying Cross (United States)
Recipients of the Legion of Merit
North American Aerospace Defense Command
Military personnel from Chicago
United States Air Force personnel of the Vietnam War
United States Military Academy alumni
University of Iowa alumni
Dwight D. Eisenhower School for National Security and Resource Strategy alumni
U.S. Air Force Test Pilot School alumni
Recipients of the Air Medal
Recipients of the Defense Distinguished Service Medal
Recipients of the Air Force Distinguished Service Medal